"A Bitter End" is a song co-written and recorded by American country music artist Deryl Dodd.  It was released in September 1998 as the first single from the album Deryl Dodd.  The song reached #26 on the Billboard Hot Country Singles & Tracks chart.  The song was written by Dodd and Kenny Beard.

Critical reception
A review of the album in Billboard stated that the song was a "classic 'woe is lonely me' weeper."

Chart performance

References

1998 singles
1998 songs
Deryl Dodd songs
Songs written by Kenny Beard
Song recordings produced by Blake Chancey
Columbia Records singles